Samuel Ayres Spencer (died March 21, 1904) was an American politician who served in the Virginia House of Delegates.

References

External links 

Democratic Party members of the Virginia House of Delegates
19th-century American politicians